Golf competitions at the 2021 Southeast Asian Games took place at Heron Lake Golf Course in Vĩnh Phúc, Vietnam from 13 to 18 May 2022.

Medal table

Medalists

Reference

External links
  

2021 Southeast Asian Games events
2021
Southeast Asian Games